Chris Bertoia is the current head coach and manager of football operations for the University of Waterloo's football team, the Waterloo Warriors, a position he has held since the 2015 U Sports season. He played CIAU football for the Warriors as part of the only two Yates Cup winning teams in school history in 1997 and 1999.

Coaching career
Following graduation, he was the offensive line coach for Catholic Central High School in London, Ontario from 2000 to 2003 while holding the same role from 2002 to 2004 with the London Beefeaters of the Canadian Junior Football League. He then moved to the Maritimes for his first collegiate coaching position with the St. Francis Xavier X-Men in 2005 where he served as the offensive and defensive line coach, recruiting coordinator and strength and conditioning coach over his four-year tenure there. He moved back to his hometown of London in 2009 to become the offensive line coach and recruitment coordinator for the Western Mustangs. He was with the Mustangs program through to the 2014 season until he was named Waterloo's head coach on December 18, 2014. He was named OUA coach of the year in 2017 after leading the program to a 4-4 record following back-to-back winless seasons.

Personal life
Bertoia currently resides in Woodstock, Ontario with his wife, Tracie, and their children, Johnathan and Emma.

References

External links 
 Waterloo Warriors bio

Living people
Sportspeople from London, Ontario
Players of Canadian football from Ontario
Waterloo Warriors football players
St. Francis Xavier X-Men football coaches
Western Mustangs football coaches
Waterloo Warriors football coaches
Year of birth missing (living people)